Diosdado Gabi, nicknamed Prince (born September 9, 1979 in Davao City, Philippines) is a retired Filipino professional boxer.

Personal life
Gabi is married and has a young son that he left back in the Philippines to fight overseas in the United States. "We come from a very poor family. My father is a fisherman. All we eat sometimes is what he catches. I try to send them as much money as often as I can".

Boxing career

Early career
On May 8, 2001, after building an undefeated record of 11-0, Gabi fought for the minor World Boxing Federation (WBF) super flyweight title against the then holder of the title, Samson Dutch Boy Gym (40-0) of Thailand. Gabi suffered his first loss as a professional, losing on points to Dutch Boy Gym, who later retired undefeated with a record of 43-0. After two wins following his loss to Dutch Boy Gym, he suffered yet another setback when he faced another undefeated Thai, Peesaddaeng Kiatsakthanee (11-0), whom he lost to by unanimous decision (UD) for the latter's WBC Asian Boxing Council Super Flyweight title.

Gabi won seven more bouts, and drew once (after his loss to Kiatsakthanee) before he was able to vie for the WBC International flyweight title, then held by compatriot, Randy Mangubat. Gabi won the belt by technical decision (TD) through twelve rounds, winning by scores of 116-111, 114-112, 116-110. After winning three more fights after his win against Mangubat, Gabi fought Eric Barcelona (whom he defeated six years ago, in 1999, in just his fourth pro fight). The result of the fight was just the same, Gabi defeated Barcelona by TD through 5 rounds, after an accidental headbutt caused the fight to be stopped.

First and Last World Title shot
On March 3, 2006, in Chumash Casino in Santa Ynez, California, in Gabi's second fight in the United States, he got his first (and last) shot at a world title. He fought the then undefeated IBO and IBF Flyweight World Champion, Vic Darchinyan (24-0). Unfortunately, Gabi was caught with a fierce left punch in the 8th round, resulting in an eight round technical knockout win for Darchinyan.

In an effort to help his fellow friend and fellow Filipino boxer Nonito Donaire prepare to fight Darchinyan, Gabi gave advice that the young fighter acknowledged after the bout. Donaire went on to knock out Darchinyan to become a world champion, something Gabi never accomplished, but he did help a friend, and that's what matters. Donaire said "Gabi taught me a little bit and told me what this guy (Darchinyan) did and he helped out a lot for this fight".

The Prince's Farewell
On March 15, 2008, after winning four more bouts after his loss to Darchinyan, Gabi faced the then WBO NABO Bantamweight Champion, Abner Mares for his title in the undercard of Manny Pacquiao's rematch with Juan Manuel Márquez. Mares, who was undefeated coming into the bout with 15 wins and 0 losses, stopped Gabi in his tracks in just two rounds. Gabi later retired from the sport following the loss.

Controversy
On August 17, 2007 Gabi was ordered arrested for breaching a contract with Cotabato Vice Governor, Emmanuel Piñol. MTC Judge Antonina Escovilla issued the warrant of arrest based on the complaint of Piñol who sought P4.8 million from Gabi.

References

External links
 

1979 births
Bantamweight boxers
Super-flyweight boxers
Flyweight boxers
Living people
Sportspeople from Davao City
Boxers from Davao del Sur
Southpaw boxers
Filipino male boxers